This article lists the AmaHlubi kings and chiefs.

Hlubi Chiefs
Luphindo 
Ludidi
Hadebe
Mdletye
Ndaba
Zibi
Dlomo
Magadla
Mehlomakhulu
Masoka
Siphambo
Ntsele/Nasele

Further reading

References

Monarchies of South Africa